The Minister for Tourism is a minister in the Government of New South Wales with responsibilities for tourism in the state of New South Wales, Australia. It has often been combined with other portfolio responsibilities, most commonly Sport.

List of ministers
The following individuals have served as minister where tourism was one of the responsibilities in the portfolio:

Assistant ministers

See also 

List of New South Wales government agencies

Notes

References

Tourism in New South Wales
Tourism